Mbosi (Mboshi) is a Bantu language spoken by the Mbochi people in the Republic of Congo.

References

Mboshi languages
Languages of the Republic of the Congo